Evelyn Haas, born Evelyn Traeger (born 7 April 1949) is a German former First Senate Constitutional Court judge and current Honorary Professor of Law.  She was the first woman to be elected to the Constitutional Court in Germany.

Biography
After receiving her doctorate in 1974, Haas became a judge in Lower Saxony.  She was at the Administrative Court for ten months, then seconded to the local government in Wolfsburg.  From 1982 to 1986 she was seconded as a research assistant at the Federal Government of Germany and from 1986 to 1990, a judge at the Higher Administrative Court of Lüneburg.  From 1987 to 1990 she was also Head of Unit in the Lower Saxony State Chancellery.

From September 1994 she was in the First Senate of the Bundesverfassungsgericht (Federal Constitutional Court of Germany).  Her twelve-year term ended in 2006 and Wilhelm Schluckebier succeeded her.

She was responsible for certain areas of German tax law, development law, construction law, land law, the German expropriation law, land transport and urban development.  She was a planning law specialist, except for environment law.  She had input on several landmark case law decisions, sometimes dissenting from her colleagues.

With her departure, only one woman (Christine Hohmann-Dennhardt) sat on the German First Senate.  This led to a debate about whether women are still at a disadvantage in the German legal system.

Since 2002 she has taught as an Honorary Professor at Eberhard-Karls-Universität, Tübingen.

References

External links
 
 Pressemitteilung des Bundesverfassungsgerichtes anlässlich ihres Ausscheidens

Living people
1949 births
Justices of the Federal Constitutional Court
German women judges
Grand Crosses with Star and Sash of the Order of Merit of the Federal Republic of Germany
Constitutional court women judges
Academic staff of the University of Tübingen
20th-century German judges
21st-century German judges
20th-century women judges
21st-century women judges
20th-century German women politicians
21st-century German women politicians